Schwarzwälder Bote, also known as Schwabo, is a German regional daily newspaper for the Black Forest and Upper Neckar region.

Schwabo operates a network of 15 branches, three service points, and 18 local editorial offices. The main circulation area, including the partner newspapers Oberbadische Zeitung and Lahrer Zeitung, extends from Calw and Bad Herrenalb in the north to Lörrach in the south, from Lahr in the west to Balingen and Albstadt in the East. The sold circulation is 105,265 copies, a decrease of 23.9 percent since 1998.

Since 2001 the "Schwabo" has received the national part of its content from the Stuttgarter Nachrichten.

Ownership structure
Schwabo is published by the Schwarzwälder Bote Mediengesellschaft mbH publishing house (HRB 480886 AG Stuttgart), in which the Stuttgart-based Medienholding Süd GmbH (MSG) holds 90% and the Württemberger Zeitung GmbH 10% of the capital. Carsten Huber is the managing director.

On October 15, 2008, a profit and loss transfer agreement was concluded with MSG. With holdings in other publishing houses and media companies, the publishing house forms the Schwarzwälder Bote Mediengruppe division of Südwestdeutsche Medien Holding GmbH (SWMH).

Under the umbrella of the Schwarzwälder Bote Mediengruppe, the publisher brings together not only its daily newspaper titles, but also companies for advertising and online services, telephone marketing and company publications, printing and distribution.

Schwabo has been printed in the Southwest Printing Center in Villingen since 2003. The administration and editorial team is based at the publishing location in Oberndorf am Neckar. In 2015, the offer within the media group was expanded to include the radio station Das neue Radio Neckarburg.

The company Black Bote GmbH & Co. KG (HRA 480264 AG Stuttgart) acts as the heirs of the founder of the Black Forest messenger Wilhelm Brandecker and with 18% of the capital of the media holding Süd GmbH (MSG) as a minority owner of the parent company of Black Bote media mbH involved. As a member of the Württemberg publishers group, she holds a capital share in Südwestdeutsche Medien Holding GmbH (SWMH).  SWMH is the majority owner of MSG with 82% of the capital.

Richard Rebmann is a partner in the Schwarzwälder Bote GmbH & Co. KG and publisher of the Schwarzwälder Boten.

References

External links

 

Newspapers published in Germany